Hengameh Mofid (born 22 December 1955) is an Iranian film/theater actress, director, dramatist and University tutor.

Life 
She was born in January 1956 Tehran, Iran. She is the youngest child of Gholamhossein Mofid, a well-known actor, teacher and calligrapher and his wife, Ghodssiyeh Farivar, a high school headmistress, they had 7 children and in years, they become one of the most famous and well-known families in Iranian theater and cinema.

Her brothers Bijan, Bahman and Ardavan are all in theater business. In fact, it was their father, who was one of the famous actors at his time and his oldest son, Bijan Mofid- one of the most famous writers and theater directors of all times, who –indirectly- encourage the younger ones to be in theater business as well.

Raised in such an artful environment, She entered Tehran conservatory and after graduating, she entered Art College in Tehran. Meanwhile, she was a member in the only professional theater group working specially for children at the Institute for the Intellectual Development of children and Young Adults (IIDCYA, aka. kanoon) under the supervision of Mr. Don Roger Laffoon, director and tutor of Theatre. There she met her future husband and longtime collaborator, Kambiz Samimi Mofakham. They married in 1977 and have three children; all of them are in Art business.

She also collaborated with Ahmad Niktalab in the 1970s in the fields of independent culture and art in the municipality of Tehran.

Being the first and best in children's theater, Kanoon Theater group did so many great performances including "Miss Butterfly", "The cloak of thousand tales", "Kouti & Mouti", "An event in The Puppet Town" and many others. They also performed in the Hamburg, Wales and Sydney International festivals and had many workshops for children all over the world.

Expanding career
Eventually, after becoming a mother, Hengameh leaves kanoon group – that really was not active for so long - and continue her career as voice actress in 4 story records under the "Chehel Tooti" records contract and also recorded a children's favorite nursery songs album" Little Songs" that still is the no.1 in children music records in Iran- with the same company.

She also began a new career as a teacher in kindergarten and elementary schools that leads to establishing a private kindergarten with her husband and was the headmistress there for 5 years.

Since 1983, she had a continuous collaboration with children department of IRIB (Islamic Republic of Iran Broadcasting) in many fields such as: writing, acting, directing, song writing and composing. She said that working for children as a teacher, help her to stay connected to their fantasy world. Her special talent in thinking as a child and a grownup in the same time, make her one of the successful writers for children. Hengameh created some lovable characters that are still in 3 generation's mind, their funny way of talking (usually with her own voice), their simple yet clever conversations and the big lesson they taught without being too preachy.

According to herself "Story telling is one of the oldest, most common and most effective forms of art. Everyone knows how a good story can make quarrelsome children forget their quarrel and get them together."
"Story telling is a direct connection between children and grownups, and it can be as simple and friendly as a good conversation."

At the year 1988, she continued her study after the Cultural Revolution and graduated from University of Tehran in Dramatic Literature.

Since 2000, along with other activities, Hengameh Mofid has a continuous collaboration with art universities as theater, music and play writing tutor.

She also works with several amateur theater groups as voice and acting instructor.

Activities and works
A brief List

Literary works for puppet tele-theaters and TV series

As writer and director:
The Farm of Bibi khanoon (first season) (مزرعه بی بی خانوم)
The Farm of Bibi khanoon (second season) (مزرعه بی بی خانوم)
Night Time Stories (قصه های شبانه)
Flower Time "Mo-seme Gol" (موسم گل)
The Little Cook (live TV. series) (آشپز کوچولو)
Dara & Sara (live TV. series) (دارا و سارا)
Sootak & Tootak (سوتک و توتک)

As scriptwriter, voice actress, songwriter and music composer (TV. series)

Cloud, Wind, Moon And Sun (Dir. K. Samimi Mofakham)(ابر و باد و مه و خورشيد)
Sonny And Daddy (Dir. K. Samimi Mofakham) (داداش و باباش)
Miss Nazanin (Nazanin khanoom) (Dir. R. Ahmadi) (نازنين خانوم)
Water, Water, Life (Dir. K. Samimi Mofakham)  (آب، آب، زندگی)
Mr. Mabaada (Dir. K. Samimi Mofakham)  (آقای مبادا)
Gholamhossein Khan Asl Tehrani - a TV. series about city of Tehran at the old times according to Gholamhossein khan, the puppet character- (Dir. M. Boroumand) (غلامحسين خان اصل تهرانی)
Hooshi, Gooshi and Mom (Dir. A. Bezdoudeh)
Grannie's house (Dir. M. Boroumand) (خونه مادر بزرگه)
The Adventures Of Taghi Jan ( Dir. H. Pourshirazi) (ماجراهای تقی جان)
Lazybones "Roofoozeh" (Dir. M. Mahboob) (رفوزه)
The Singing Bialou (Dir. M. Boroumand) (بیالوی آوازه خان)
The Drifters (Dir. A. Seddigh) (در به در ها)

As voice actress
Allesoon & Vallesoon (Dir. K. Samimi Mofakham)  (السون و ولسون)
The Starling And The Wise Hoopoe (Dir. I.Tahmasb)
The Itsy-Bitsy Sparrow (Dir. K. Samimi Mofakham) (گنجشکک اشی مشی)

Plays:

Appearances

Children and young adults plays from 1971 to 1978, The professional theater group, the Institute for the Intellectual Development of children and Young Adults (Kanoon), directed by:
Don Roger Laffoon
Ardavan Mofid

The Butterfly (Shaparak khanoom) (شاپرک خانوم)
The Turnip  (ترب)
Kouti & Mouti  (کوتی و موت)
Rise And Shine Miss Sun (khorshid khanoom aaftaab kon) (خورشید خانوم آفتاب کن)
An Event In The Puppet Town  (حادثه ای در شهر عروسک ها)
The Cloak Of Thousand Tales  (شنل هزار قصه)
The Robots
Maktab Khaneh (مکتب خانه)
Aria De Capo  (آريا دکاپو)
The Eagle And The Fox  (عقاب و روباه)
The Sleeping Luck (Bakhte khofteh)  (بخت خفته)
Rostam & Sohraab (رستم و سهراب)

Appearances in plays for adults
The Moon And The Leopard (written & Directed by: Bijan Mofid) 1971  (ماه و پلنگ)
Sohraab, Horse And Dragonfly (written & Directed by: Bijan Mofid) 1978  (سهراب و اسب و سنجاقک)

As songwriter and music composer
The Gold Tooth (Dir. D.Mirbagheri)  2001  (دندون طلا)
A tableau of Love" Pardeh Asheghi"  (Dir. D.Mirbagheri) 2002  (پرده عاشقی)

As director
The Eagle And The Fox 2004 (عقاب و روباه)

AS writer
Pahlevan Kachal and Ververeh jadoo (Dir. H. Jeddikar) (پهلوان کچل و وروره جادو)

Cinema:
The Drifters –feature film version- (As scriptwriter, songwriter and voice actress) (در به در ها)
Once Upon a Time ( Songwriter and voice actress) (یکی بود یکی نبود)
Children of Iran -a series of feature films, Dir. M. Sarhangi- ( As narrator) (بچه های ايران)
Lala & Loulou- animated film, Dir. F. Sorkhabi- (As narrator and voice actress) (لالا و لولو)
The Refugee – live action feature film Dir. R. Mollagholipour- (As actress) (پناهنده)
Golnaar – children fantasy film, Dir. Kambuzia Partovi- (voice actress) (گلنار)
Squash Girl –Dir. R. Jian- (voice actress)

Children Story Record Albums

Chehel tooti Co. albums:
The Butterfly (Shaparak khanoom) (شاپرک خانوم)
The Turnip  (ترب)
Kouti & Mouti  (کوتی و موت)
The Wonderful Farm (Les contes du chat perché) (دم گربه)
First Fly (اولين پرواز)
Little Songs (favorite nursery songs) (ترانه های کوچک برای بيداری)

Others:
The Sparrow And The Cotton Boll (as Narrator) (گنجشکک و يک غوزه)
Six Raven Chicks And a Fox (Kanoon) (شش جوجه کلاغ و يک روباه)
A children's Tale (M. Azadi)
Golnaar ( Khaneh Honar va Adabiat) (گلنار)

Educating:
Art Teacher at elementary schools ( Ministry of Education)
Municipality Zone No.10,  kindergartens supervisor ( Ministry of Education)
Concessionaire and headmistress of a private kindergarten for 5 years
Headmistress and supervisor at the "Behesht Cultural Centre"
Organizing Workshops at International puppet Theater Festival, Tehran, Iran
Organizing Workshops with Kalagh Art Group

Puppet Theater and Performing art tutor at:
Soureh Art University
University of Tehran, Faculty of Fine Art
Art University, Faculty of Cinema & Theater

Other Activities 
From 1971 to 1978

Member of professional children and young adults' theater at The institute for the intellectual development of children and young adults (Kanoon)
Participation in the Humburg, Wales and Sidney International theater festivals for children and young adults
Participation in Folklore dance Festival at Australia, Canberra
Member of The Itinerant Theater (Kanoon)

Recent Activities
Member of selection committee in Tehran International Puppet Festival For University Students 2005
Member of selection committee in The Mobarak Unima International Puppet Festival 2006

Awards:
Honorary Title and Highest insignia of the Academy of Dramatic Arts for Lifetime Achievement in Dramatic Arts
Honorary Title and Highest insignia of the International Puppet Theater of Tehran
Honorary Title and Highest insignia of the Municipality of Tehran for Lifetime Achievement in Arts
Best Play award for writing the "Girls from the Gardens of Carpet" at Fajr International Festival
Best Directing award for "night time stories" at The Fourth Television Festival

See also 
List of Iranians
List of Persian poets and authors

References

External links
There is No Career for Students of Puppet Show, Iranian Artists Organization

Iranian women artists
Iranian dramatists and playwrights
Iranian theatre directors
Iranian screenwriters
Iranian women film directors
Iranian children's writers
1956 births
Living people
Iranian actresses
Iranian voice actresses
People from Tehran
University of Tehran alumni